Zak may refer to:

People
 Zak (surname), a surname of Russian origin
 Żak, a Polish surname
 Žák, a Czech surname
 Zak (given name)

Fictional characters
 Zak Adama, in the Battlestar Galactica franchise
 Zak Dingle, in UK TV Emmerdale
 Zak McKracken and the Alien Mindbenders video game
 Zak Ramsey, in UK TV Hollyoaks
 Zak Silver, in the comic El Muerto: The Aztec Zombie

Other uses
 Zak, Iran, a village in Razavi Khorasan Province
 LWD Żak, a 1940s Polish aircraft
 FK ŽAK Kikinda, a football club in Serbia
 ŽAK Subotica, a football club  1921–1945, Yugoslavia
 ZAK a human gene
 ISO 639-3 code for the Zanaki language of Tanzania

See also
 Zac, a given name
 Zach or Zack (disambiguation)